The prime minister of Zimbabwe Rhodesia was the head of government of Zimbabwe Rhodesia. Like the country itself, it was never internationally recognized.

The only prime minister of Zimbabwe Rhodesia was Abel Muzorewa.

History of the office
The position was established on 1 June 1979, under the terms of the Internal Settlement negotiated between the government of Rhodesia and moderate African nationalists. It existed until, under the terms of the Lancaster House Agreement, control was turned over to Christopher Soames as Governor of Southern Rhodesia on 12 December 1979.

Prime Minister of Zimbabwe Rhodesia (1979)
Parties

See also
President of Zimbabwe Rhodesia
Government of Zimbabwe Rhodesia
Prime Minister of Rhodesia
Prime Minister of Zimbabwe

References

Politics of Rhodesia
Zimbabwe Rhodesia
Titles held only by one person